Rich Aucoin is a Canadian musician, based in Halifax, Nova Scotia.  He has toured throughout North and South America, Europe and Australia; sometimes touring by bicycle for charity. He's released 5 studio LPs and a handful of EPs and singles and won several Canadian awards including Sirius XM Indie Awards' Emerging Artist of the Year. Oftentimes, his albums act as alternative scores to films in the same way as Dark Side of the Rainbow is a combination of The Wizard of Oz (1939 film) and the Pink Floyd album The Dark Side of the Moon. He has used a number of experimental recording techniques on his albums but is perhaps best known for his ever-evolving interactive communal sing-a-long multi-media live show.

Albums

1.1 - Personal Publication EP

At the end of his philosophy degree (University of King's College/Dalhousie University 2006 BA Hons. Philosophy & Contemporary Studies), Aucoin started work on his first EP, Personal Publication. Aucoin recorded and performed it by himself with just one microphone (a Behringer B-1) and played over a dozen instruments on the EP. During this time Aucoin went on tour playing vibraphone/drumset and synth in The Hylozoists; his older brother, Paul Aucoin's band in Spring 2006 along with Fembots (band) and Cuff the Duke.

Inspired by seeing Dark Side of The Rainbow at a midnight screening at The Oxford Theatre in Halifax, Nova Scotia, Aucoin set out to write an EP to sync up to Dr. Seuss’ How the Grinch Stole Christmas! (TV special) in the same manner that one can sync up Pink Floyd's Dark Side of The Moon with the film The Wizard of Oz. Aucoin put the video up on Youtube where it garnered some light virality until it was taken down after receiving a Cease & Desist from Dr. Seuss Enterprises LP.

Aucoin played his first show December 20, 2006 at Tribeca in Halifax and released Personal Publication EP in the winter of 2007 after meeting long-time producing partner Joel Waddell who came on to complete the mixing process with Aucoin. The self-released EP marked the debut of Aucoin touring outside of Halifax, Nova Scotia as he did his first Canadian tour that spring/summer across Canada by bicycle where he raised money for Childhood Cancer Canada. Aucoin finished the tour after 30 dates from Victoria, BC to Halifax, NS and then geared up for another tour in The Hylozoists across Canada doing support for The Besnard Lakes where, at the end of the tour, Aucoin faced a health crisis when the shift in touring styles led to a series of seizures upon return to Halifax.

1.2 - Publication Publication EP

In the winter of 2008, Aucoin set out to do the opposite of the first EP and record a record with as many friends and collaborators as possible and, as the idea grew, it became impossible to fit everyone onto just an EP length of time and so the EP started turning into what would become Aucoin's debut LP, We're All Dying To Live.

1.3 - We're All Dying To Live

We're All Dying To Live was released in November 2011, performed at Halifax Pop Explosion at St. Matthew's United Church with a one-night-only band of about 80 performers, the performance won Best Live Show In The Past Year in that year's Best Of Awards by Halifax's Weekly The Coast. Aucoin began writing the album in the winter of 2008 and wrote it to sync up with a film he cut together out of around 35 films from the public domain into one film that intercuts classics like Night of the Living Dead to It's a Wonderful Life.

Aucoin set out to record the album on the road again with just one microphone, this time a Rode NT2 and an Mbox and Pro Tools 32 Track LE and his laptop. Aucoin ran a series of half marathons raising money for Heart and Stroke Foundation of Canada while stopping in each city across Canada to record with as many musicians as possible.

Aucoin recorded with several Canadian band members including Jay Ferguson of Sloan, You Say Party, Michael Small of The Meligrove Band, Rae Spoon, Tim Kingsbury of The Arcade Fire, Bob Wiseman, The Constantines, Julie Penner of Broken Social Scene, Joel Plaskett, Jenn Grant, Windome Earle, Stephen Carrol of The Weakerthans, Wayne Petti of Cuff The Duke, FemBots, The Dubervilles, Gobble Gobble, Peter Togni, Wildlife, Hey Rosetta, Ruby Jean & The Thoughtful Bees, Dan Mangan, Paul Bandwatt of Rural Alberta Advantage, Bernard Lakes, David Myles, Crissi Cochrane, Heavy Blinkers, The Diableros, Tyler Messick, Tanya Davis, The Golden Dogs, BA Johnston, Laura Barrett, The First Aid Kit, Immaculate Machine, Cary Pratt, Amelia Curran, Jimmy Lightning of Do Make Say Think, Jon McKeil, Rebekah Higgs and Wax Mannequin.

Aucoin recorded with these and other musicians across Canada on the tour either in the venues while playing shows together or at studios like: Break Glass with Jace Lasek, Hotel 2 Tango with Howard Bilerman, Common Ground with Andrew Watt, Echo Chamber with David Ewenson, Halla with Paul Aucoin and at St. Mary's Basilica Cathedral with Peter Togni and Aucoin was also able to record a small portion while at Abbey Road Studios on his first tour to the UK when he guested on musician Doug Taylor's album. The album was mixed and mastered in the UK as well mixed by David Wrench (music producer) and mastered by Nilesh Patel at The Exchange and produced by Aucoin and Joel Waddell. The album appeared on the !earshot Campus and Community National Top 50 Albums chart in January, 2012. It was given Album of The Week by the National Post and was a longlisted nominee for the 2012 Polaris Music Prize in June of that year.

1.4 - Ephemeral

Aucoin started work on Ephemeral in spring 2010 which would be a collection of songs more representative of the high-energy live show. Aucoin decided to go back to syncing the album with just one piece of media rather than the collage of public domain films for We're All Dying to Live and so Ephemeral plays as an alt soundtrack to the 1979 Will Vinton claymation masterpiece of The Little Prince. Aucoin made a choir of approximately 20,000 by bringing out a microphone during his festival performances over the summer of 2012 all over Canada/US and Europe and recorded the audiences singing along to a new unreleased song which would become Ephemeral’s opening track, Meaning In Life. The album also opens with a vocal sample of Wayne Coyne from The Flaming Lips talking to Neil Fridd of Terror Pigeon (and long-time collaborator with Aucoin) about “being into long things” after Fridd and Aucoin had just gotten off stage as costumed dancers for a Lips festival show in 2011 at the Hangout Music Festival where Aucoin was also performing. The album cover image is of the iconic moon landing footprint and is the one image that sums up humankind's history at the Griffith Observatory in Los Angeles on their History of The Universe timeline.

Aucoin recorded again at Hotel 2 Tango with Howard Bilerman, Rooster studios with Don Kerr, Echo Lake with Daniel Ledwell, Dream House with Alex Bonenfant, and again at St. Mary's Cathedral Basilica in Halifax with Peter Togni. The album was mixed by a number of mixers: Elijah Walsh, Peter Chapman, Eric Broucek, Graeme Campbell, Graham Walsh, Stephen Paul, Daniel Ledwell and Mick Guzauski and was produced by Aucoin and Joel Waddell and was mastered by Dave Cooley. It was released by Bonsound and debuted at The Halifax Pop Explosion in 2014. The album features around a dozen players including Maylee Todd and Allie X. Aucoin received the cover of Exclaim! Magazine and his second long-listing for The Polaris Music Prize. Also during this time, both Ephemeral and We're All Dying to Live were put out by France label Platinum as Aucoin began to frequently tour France and Europe.

1.5 - Rich Aucoin with Symphony Nova Scotia

In 2015, Aucoin was invited to perform with Symphony Nova Scotia in its fusion program in collaboration with The Halifax Pop Explosion. Although it was never officially recorded, the performance was a collection of newly arranged versions off Aucoin's first two albums arranged by Aucoin.

1.6 - Release

Release, originally called to be called ‘Death’, began tracking in the winter of 2016 at Old Confidence Lodge and syncs with Disney's Alice in Wonderland (1951 film). The album also features around 70 performers including: the drumming of Justin Peroff of Broken Social Scene as well as Tony Dallas of Brat Boy and Jeremy Malvin of Chrome Sparks, vocals of Rose Cousins and Reeny Smith, acoustic guitar of Dan Mangan and the bass of Commander Meouch of TWRP (band). During the recording process, Aucoin was robbed of his laptop and lost much of the record in January 2017 forcing him to start again with what back ups remained. Every track on Release has vocal manipulation and synths made out of vocal samples from its singers and the song The Past is completely made from vocal samples by Aucoin.

Release was recorded in at Rec Room with Sheldon Zaharko, Taurus Recording with Thomas D’arcy, The Nook with David Plowman, Sonology with Jeff McMurrich, Planet Studios with Jean-Bruno Pinard, Hotel 2 Tango with Howard Bilerman, Virtue and Vice with Ben Talmi, Echo Lake with Daniel Ledwell, Old Confidence Lodge with Diego Medina, Alley Road with Lukas Pearse, Sonic Temple with Darren Van Niekerk, New Scotland Yard with Thomas Stajcer and again with Peter Togni recording church organ at Cathedral Church of All Saints and was produced by Aucoin and Joel Waddell and was mixed by Howie Beck and mastered by Noah Mintz. Cover image is a 3D printed life-sized version of Aucoin's skull and was painted by artist Laura Dawe and photographed by photographer Meghan Tansey Whitton and designed by Seth Smith. The album was released in May 2019 by Dine Alone Records' Haven Sounds imprint.

1.8 - United States

For Aucoin's first record after the first trilogy, Aucoin returned to his roots of cycling across a country for tour only this time across America in Spring 2018. Aucoin wrote the entire album while on his bicycle with a series of vocal memos while he cycled from Los Angeles to New York raining money for Mental Health America and The Canadian Mental Health Association. Aucoin documented his tour with Paste (magazine). This is Aucoin's first album not to be synced with an existing media as Aucoin wrote a track for each state he cycled through based on the observations of the American landscape and society. It was written and recorded by Aucoin while on tour and then later re-realized primarily at Taurus Recording with Thomas D’arcy and Old Confidence Lodge with Diego Medina, mixed by Howie Beck and produced by Aucoin and Joel Waddell with ‘Walls’ was mixed and produced by Kevin Maher and was mastered by Brian ‘Big Bass’ Gardner. Its cover is a photo taken by Aucoin of a large car dealership's enormous American Flag flying at half-mast. It was the second release by Dine Alone's Haven Sounds for Aucoin in October 2020. The first single for the record “How It Breaks" went #1 on the CBC Top 20 Countdown in June 2020. Aucoin released a stand-alone single in 2022 called We're In It Together which featured a choir made up of 100 fans emailing their voice memos and home recordings to Aucoin and featured: Dr. Sung of TWRP, Ninja Brian of Ninja Sex Party and Dylan Germick of Planet Booty.

1.9 - Synthetic: A Synth Odyssey - Season 1

Aucoin began work for Synthetic: A Synth Odyssey in March 2020 while doing an Artist In Residency at the National Music Centre in Calgary, Alberta. With the bulk recorded just before the pandemic shutdowns beganm Synthetic was paused in April 2020 as Aucoin shifted to work on music for the documentary No Ordinary Man (film) directed by Aisling Chin-Yee and Chase Joynt. Aucoin plays all the sum 37 synthesizers on Season 1 which was released in October 2022 by We Are Busy Bodies. The album is mixed by Howie Beck and produced by Aucoin, Joel Waddell and Gordon Huntley. The album features the legendary Tonto synthesizer made famous by Brian De Palma in his film Phantom of the Paradise and used by greatest like Stevie Wonder. The album was mastered by Noah Mintz and designed by Mat Dunlap. The cover for each of the four seasons of the album features the synthesizers used on each. The album is nominated for a Juno Award for Electronic Album of The Year.

Live Show 

The Globe and Mail has said "Aucoin's sweat-soaked shows are near legendary events of mosh-pit euphoria, surfboard situations and dancing underneath a multicoloured parachute". Aucoin might be best known for his live show in Canada. It began with Aucoin playing like a silent film era pianist on the size of the stage with the focus being on the screen he was playing the music to accompany but then slowly morphed into a communal singalong dance-party with Aucoin frequently in the middle of the audience leading the choruses. The show has always involved a mixed media performance involving a collage of images which the show runs in sync to with everything from the films Aucoin composed the music to synchronize with to viral videos and memes to anything and everything as visual samples. Often times, the framing of a night at the movies is used with opening previews of the other bands on the bill to fake advertisements and a crowd singalong of all the major media companies’ fanfares mashed up together. Aucoin gave out custom 3D glasses in 2009 for his sets which were partially in 3D. Aucoin has been known to make a personalized show for every performance given thousands of fans personalized intro credits in the opening credits of the show; messages usually revolve around topical humour or cultural references like “So and So doesn't settle for anything, except Catan”. Aucoin has narration and other comedy elements added between songs to give time for costume changes and other props like crowd surfing on a real surf board. Another signature element has been the use of a multi-coloured parachute like the kind used in elementary school gym class which he throws over the audience and leads the singing dance party underneath. The shows have had heavy use of many other props with everything from water gun fights to balloon drops and usually a sea of confetti. Group movement plays a big role with Aucoin leading the audience through many interactive moments and large group coordination. Aucoin may play either solo with samples or with a various configuration of backing band members from all over North America and Europe. Some configurations are drums, bass, synths, guitar, horns and back up singers to having larger bands with strings and choral groups. Reoccurring members have featured: Joel Waddell on drums, Darryl Smith on guitar, Erik VanLunen on bass as the core Halifax-based band with R Sun on keyboards and Nathan Pilon on Saxophone. Satellite bandmates have included: Tony Dallas of Fake Shark, Phil Maloney of Hey Rosetta!, Jeremy Malvin of Chrome Sparks, Brad Weber of Caribou, Antoine Woodmann of Monolithe Noir, Baudouin and Guillaume Marnez of Encore, Aucoin had nearly 90 musicians join him for his album release for We're All Dying To Live at the Halifax Pop Explosion in 2011 at St. Matthew's Church. Aucoin also was backed by Choir! Choir! Choir! at The Toronto Urban Roots Festival in 2015. Aucoin has also been a promoter of the Gender Is Over! If You Want It Trans-rights campaign and worn their tank top while performing since 2017. Aucoin also developed a performance character in 2019 for his first shows doing support for TWRP and, keeping with the sci-fi style of the band, Aucoin developed The Space Cowboy and would enter stage to the Steve Miller Band track The Joker and its line “some people call me the space cowboy”. Aucoin has announced to retire this version of the show at the end of 2025.

Aucoin has toured extensively across North America as well as Europe, South America and Australia. Beginning with much DIY touring around America with Terror Pigeon and Gobble Gobble, Grimes, Moon King, Born Gold to doing major US touring with TWRP and Planet Booty and major France touring with Salut C’est Cool and Naive New Beaters and several major Canadian support tours with Hey Rosetta!, K-os, Lights, Arkells, Hot Hot Heat and The Mounties. Aucoin has played many major festivals over the years including: Osheaga, Ottawa Bluesfest, Vielles Charrues, Eurockéennes, Calvi on The Rocks, Sakifo, Toronto Urban Roots Festival, Regina Folk Festival, Best Kept Secret, Montreal Jazz Festival, The Hangout, Trans Musicales, Berlin Music Fest, Art Basel Miami, Halifax Jazz Festival, Panoramas, Festival Eletronika, C/O Pop Koln, Pemberton, World Pride, Victoria Jazz Festival, Rifflandia, Winnipeg Folk Festival, Luminato Art Festival, Iceland Airwaves, The Great Escape, Australian Music Week, Canadian Music Week, CMJ, NXNE, Sled Island, Dawson City Music Festival, SXSW, and Pop Montreal. Aucoin also has the record as the artist who played his hometown Halifax Pop Explosion more than any other artist during its run. Aucoin has supported: Dan Deacon, Girl Talk, Deerhoof, of Montreal, Caribou, Holy Fuck, The Constantines, The Weakerthans, July Talk, Zeus, Mac DeMarco, Plants & Animals, Rubblebucket, Peelander-Z, Austra, Tegan and Sara, A Tribe Called Red, Mother Mother, Shad, Sloan, Joel Plaskett, St. Paul & The Broken Bones, Izia, Melissa Auf Der Maur and opened festival stages for: M83, Andrew WK, Of Monsters and Men, The National, Mavis Staples, The Flaming Lips & The Tragically Hip.

Videos 

Aucoin is also known for his ambitious music videos which include his first for Push being an early 3D Music video in 2009. His second video, for It, involved recreating several iconic film scenes from classic films from Forrest Gump, Ghostbusters, Taxi Driver, Top Gun, Princess Bride, E.T. The Extra Terrestrial, Die Hard to films he wrote the record to It's A Wonderful Life and Night of The Living Dead. The video went somewhat viral getting nearly a half a million views. Aucoin followed this with the same team including producers Jason Levangie & Marc Tetreault of Shut Up & Colour and director Noah Pink for "Brian Wilson Is A.L.I.V.E." which won the Prism Prize in 2013. This video involved filming a mini biopic of Beach Boys lead songwriter Brian Wilson which lead to Brian Wilson promoting the video on Twitter in September 2012. Aucoin also worked with animator Joel Mackenzie who made the 2014 Prism-nominated video for Yelling In Sleep. The next live-action video Want To Believe, also in 2012, was again with Shut Up & Colour and this time with director Jason Eisener. The concept written by Aucoin and developed by Eisener was a story about a washed up supernatural detective being inspired by a group of kids to keep the dream alive and shows them on a number of episodic adventures, was a Vimeo Staff Pick and was a mix of The X-Files meets The Goonies and other 80's nostalgia. Aucoin's next album, Release, involved making a number of videos including the title track's video having Aucoin float off the coast of Nova Scotia in a suit while a drone slowly pans out overhead, directed by Dave Hung, the video took several attempts at filming for the one-shot take. Meaghan Tansley-Whitton's video for The Mind has a non-distinct silver-draped figure standing on a number of Nova Scotia's iconic coastlines. Shot in Hollywood, Mike Bromley's video for The Dream involves Aucoin dressing as a Hollywood costumed performer and was shot hidden camera and in a run and gun style on Hollywood Boulevard. Meags Fitzgerald's Prism-nominated video for The Middle, involved time-lapse overhead filming of her ambidextrous drawing; she also used stop animation to animate the drawings as well. Hanlon McGregor & Mihaly Szabados’ video for The Change was a theatre interpretation of a gender transition. Dustin Harvey's video for Eulogy of Regret is another theatre-based interpretation of the themes of the song and is an expanded theatre-piece itself entitled How Quickly Things Change, that work involves extra verses as well that Aucoin wrote for the work. Aucoin also made a 360 VR video with Pete Macdonald and AJ King and audio spatializing by Kyle Varley for The Past which has 6 frames of Aucoin's mouth surrounding all the sides of the viewer, the spatialization has 6 stems of the song being able to be mixed by the viewer depending on the direction viewed. Aucoin also teamed up with producers Stephanie Hooker and Martin Wojtunik of Mad Ruk for The Other and was co-directed by Aucoin and Ian Angus for a dystopian sci-fi about a planet of humanoids all distinguished by masquerade masks. The video makes use of several buildings with brutalist architecture to achieve the exteriors as well as Aucoin himself making the Douglas Trumbull style miniatures filmed at the beginning of the video. Picking up where 2013's Ian Angus edited huge parachute performance compilation video for Are You Experiencing? left off, Aucoin made a few found footage edited videos for United States’ How It Breaks, Reset and Dopamine. The subjects were: protests, gun violence and a collection of Aucoin's photography documenting his bicycle tour across America in 2018, respectively. Aucoin also made a video with wrestling action figures for the track Kayfabe in 2020 when making a live video was not an option during the Covid-19 lockdowns. Aucoin returned to working with Shut Up & Colour for Walls, a video paying homage to classic and iconic music videos, it is also a sister video to their first video together of classic films for It. The video pays homage to: Prince's When Doves Cry, Beastie Boys’ Sabotage, Alanis Morissette's Ironic, Madonna's Like A Virgin, Jamiroquai's Virtual Insanity, Queen's Bohemian Rhapsody, Ok Go's Here It Goes Again, Talking Heads’ Once In A Lifetime, Buggles’ Video Killed The Radio Star, Psy's Gangnam Style, Beyonce's Single Ladies, Justin Bieber's Sorry, Drake's Hotline Bling, Radiohead's Just, Fatboyslim's Praise You, MC Hammer's Can't Touch This, Aha's Take On Me, Foo Fighter's Everlong, and both Nirvana's Smells Like Teen Spirit and the Weird Al parody Smells Like Nirvana. The video was nominated for a Prism Prize and was shared by "Weird Al" Yankovic on social media. For Synthetic, Aucoin recruited Levangie of Shut Up & Colour as well as directors Ian Angus and Noah Pink to travel to the Mojave desert and make a film based on his performance character The Space Cowboy for the track Space Western, the music video is unconventionally being released as a set of theatrical trailers rather than standard track length content style.

Discography

Studio albums
 We're All Dying to Live (2011)
 Ephemeral (2014)
 Release (2019)
 United States (2020)
 Synthetic: Season 1 (2022)

EPs
 Personal Publication (2007)
 Public Publication (2010)
 Hold (2018)

Gallery

References

External links
 

Living people
Place of birth missing (living people)
Musicians from Halifax, Nova Scotia
Canadian indie rock musicians
Canadian indie pop musicians
Acadian people
1983 births